FOX Classics is an Australian cable and satellite channel that specializes in showing television series and ad-free classic movies, themed movie nights and miniseries from the 1950s, 1960s, 1970s, 1980s and 1990s.

History
FOX Classics began as a channel shared with FX and then Fox Kids (which itself had moved from a block on Fox8 and also Shared time with The History Channel (Fox Travel/History/Soap/Talk until 1998 when the Soap and Talk Shows Moved to FX which rebrands to focus on a Female Audience) when FX Separated in 2000.

This version of the channel was a night shift for the Fox Kids channel in Australia, when Fox Kids ended at a specific time (late afternoon for the most part) on Channel 6, FOX Classics began. It was essentially, ad-free classic movies (mostly from the 20th Century Fox library), hosted by Bill Collins, who would give background information and trivia about the movie to the audience, before and after the movie. Eventually Fox Kids moved back to Fox8 on 1 February 2004 and FOX Classics became a 24-hour channel. 

In November 2008, with the addition of 111 Hits and the change in direction of the network to a catalog of 50s, 60s and 70s programs, a large amount of newer material mainly sitcoms were moved from FOX Classics.

Current Programming
 'Allo 'Allo!
 Are You Being Served?
 As Time Goes By
 Blackadder
 Bless Me, Father
 Dad’s Army
 Father Ted
 Fawlty Towers
 Keeping Up Appearances
 Only Fools and Horses
 One Foot in the Grave
 Open All Hours
 Porridge
 Yes, Prime Minister
 The Young Ones
 The Addams Family
 F Troop
 Gilligan’s Island
 Hogan's Heroes
 Jeopardy!
 M*A*S*H
 McHale's Navy
 The Munsters
 The Beverly Hillbillies
 I Love Lucy
 The Lucy Show
 Bonanza
 Laramie
 Laredo
 Rawhide
 The Wild Wild West

Former programming
 Hey, Dad
 Kingswood Country
 Mother and Son
 Parkinson
 The Saint
 Absolutely Fabulous
 The Benny Hill Show
 Bottom
 The New Statesman
 On the Buses
 Some Mothers Do 'Ave 'Em
 The Vicar of Dibley
 Agatha Christie’s Poirot
 3rd Rock from the Sun
 The Commish
 Green Acres
 Mister Ed
 Little House on the Prairie
 Evening Shade
 Hill Street Blues
 The Mary Tyler Moore Show
 Combat!
 The Ed Sullivan Show
 The Phil Silvers Show
 Hart to Hart
 The Honeymooners
 The Odd Couple
 Gunsmoke
 Maverick
 The Virginian
 Ironside
 China Beach
 Tour of Duty
 Caroline in the City
 NYPD Blue
 Laverne & Shirley
 The Waltons
 Full House
 Murphy Brown
 The Drew Carey Show
 Friends
 The Golden Girls
 Home Improvement
 Jake and the Fatman
 Matlock
 Miami Vice
 Murder, She Wrote
 The Rockford Files
 Spin City
 Batman
 Lost in Space
 Get Smart
 Happy Days
 Mork & Mindy
 Everybody Loves Raymond
 The King of Queens
 Diagnosis Murder
 MacGyver
 Walker, Texas Ranger

References

2000 establishments in Australia
English-language television stations in Australia
Television networks in Australia
Television channels and stations established in 2000
Foxtel
Classic television networks